Standard Greek may refer to:
Attic Greek, the main Greek dialect that was spoken in ancient Attica, which includes Athens
Koiné Greek, also known as Alexandrian dialect, common Attic or Hellenistic Greek, the common supra-regional form of Greek spoken and written during Hellenistic and Roman antiquity
Katharevousa, a form of the Modern Greek language conceived in the early 19th century as a compromise between Ancient Greek and the Demotic Greek of the time
Demotic Greek, the modern vernacular form of the Greek language, the form of the language that evolved naturally from Ancient Greek, which became the official standard in 1976
Standard Modern Greek

See also
Greek language question